The Rewari–Rohtak line is a railway line that connects Rewari and Rohtak in the Indian state of Haryana. Train services on this line started on 8 January 2013.

Overview
The railway line was the first new railway project in Haryana in thirty-three years. Construction began on 7 October 2007.

A new 75 km-long railway line was constructed between Asthal Bohar station that lies on Rohtal–Delhi railway line and Rewari via Jhajjar. The construction required 124 bridges over canals, drains and irrigation water courses, 36 level crossings, 32 limited-height subways and 4 bridges over roads. The length of the Rewari–Rohtak railway line is 81.3 km including 6.1 km from Rohtak to Asthal Bohar station.

Stations
There are six stations between Rohtak and Rewari. These are Asthal Bohar (station code ABO) at 6.1 km, Dighal (DGHL) at 20.4 km, Jhajjar (JHJ) at 37.1 km, Machhrauli (MHRI) at 49.0 km, Palhawas (PLHW) at 63.3 km and Gokalgarh (GKG) at 75.9 km.

Trains
Two DEMU trains (one of which runs on CNG) and one passenger train run on this line stopping at all stations en route. There is a demand that another train from Rohtak to Rewari be introduced that will return to Rohtak in the evening.

Two express trains connecting Chandigarh with Jaipur also run on this railway line.

CNG train
India's first train running on compressed natural gas (CNG) started on Rewari–Rohtak line in January 2015. Its train numbers are 74017 from Rewari and 74018 from Rohtak.

Future developments
This line is part of the following proposed NCR's Regional Orbital Rail Corridor (RORC) will pass through here:
 Panipat–Rohtak line, via Panipat–Gohana–Rohtak, existing. 
 Rohtak–Rewari line, via Rohtak–Jhajjar-Rewari, existing. 
 Rewari–Khurja line, via Rewari–Palwal–Bhiwadi–Khurja, new rail line, survey completed.
 Khurja–Meerut line, via Khurja–Bulandshahr–Hapur–Meerut, existing.  
 Meerut–Panipat line, new rail line, survey completed.

References

External links
 Northern Railway, Official website 
 Indian Railway, Official website

5 ft 6 in gauge railways in India
Railway lines opened in 2013
Rail transport in Haryana
2013 establishments in Haryana